Jacky Moucq (11 March 1922 – 1 January 2008) was a Belgian field hockey player. He competed in the men's tournament at the 1952 Summer Olympics.

References

External links
 

1922 births
2008 deaths
Belgian male field hockey players
Olympic field hockey players of Belgium
Field hockey players at the 1952 Summer Olympics
People from Uccle
Field hockey players from Brussels